Warholm is a Norwegian surname. Notable people with the surname include:

 David Warholm (1888–1971), Swedish fencer
 Harald Warholm (1920–1967), Norwegian politician
 Karsten Warholm (born 1996), Norwegian track athlete
 Sebastian Warholm (born 1995), Norwegian actor

Norwegian-language surnames